Every Secret Thing may refer to:

 Every Secret Thing (Hearst book), a memoir by Patty Hearst
 Every Secret Thing (novel), a 2004 crime novel by Laura Lippman
 Every Secret Thing (film), a 2014 American crime film based on the novel